The following is a list of ghost towns in Idaho. A ghost town is an abandoned village, town or city, usually one which contains substantial visible remains. A town often becomes a ghost town because the economic activity that supported it has failed, or due to natural or human-caused disasters such as floods, government actions or uncontrolled lawlessness.

 Aline
 Bayhorse
 Bonanza City
Burgdorf
 Burke
 Caribou City, Idaho 
 Chesterfield
 Cobalt
 Comeback Mining Camp
Copper Queen
 Custer
 De Lamar
 Florence
 Gilmore
 Golden Age camp
 Joseph
 Joseph Plains
 Idaho City
 Leesburg
 Mount Idaho
 Placerville
 Rocky Bar
 Ruby City
 Sawtooth City
 Silver City
 Strevell
 Vienna
 White Knob
 Yellow Jacket

See also
 
 
List of counties in Idaho

References

Idaho
 
Ghost towns
Ghost